Lachlan Hammond Ferguson (born 13 June 1991) is a New Zealand cricketer who represents the New Zealand national team and plays first-class cricket for Auckland. He is able to bowl at speeds in excess of 90 mph, His fastest being 97.7 mph (157.3 km/h). Known for his searing pace and lethal bouncers, he is one of the world's fastest bowlers to have ever played the game.

Domestic and T20 franchise career
In February 2017, he was bought by the Rising Pune Supergiants team for the 2017 Indian Premier League. In December 2018, he was bought by the Kolkata Knight Riders in the player auction for the 2019 Indian Premier League. In November 2019, during the 2019–20 Plunket Shield season, Ferguson took his 150th first-class wicket. In March 2021, Ferguson was signed by Yorkshire County Cricket Club ahead of the 2021 T20 Blast competition in England.

In the 2022 Indian Premier League auction, Ferguson was bought by the Gujarat Titans.

International career
In November 2016, he was added to New Zealand's One Day International (ODI) squad for their series against Australia. He made his ODI debut for New Zealand against Australia on 4 December 2016.

On 3 January 2017 he made his Twenty20 International (T20I) debut for New Zealand against Bangladesh. In the match he took two wickets with his first two deliveries, only the second player to do so.

In November 2017, he was added to New Zealand's Test squad for their series against the West Indies, but he did not play. In May 2018, he was one of twenty players to be awarded a new contract for the 2018–19 season by New Zealand Cricket.

In April 2019, he was named in New Zealand's squad for the 2019 Cricket World Cup. On 5 June 2019, in the match against Bangladesh, Ferguson took his 50th wicket in ODIs. Following the World Cup, the International Cricket Council (ICC) named Ferguson as the rising star of the squad. He was named in the Team of the Tournament by the ICC.

In November 2019, Ferguson was named in New Zealand's Test squad for their home series against England and their tour to Australia. Ahead of the first Test, Ferguson was released from the New Zealand squad to participate in the Ford Trophy. However, he was recalled back into New Zealand's Test squad for the second match of the series. He made his Test debut for New Zealand, against Australia, on 12 December 2019.

On 27 November 2020, in the first T20I against the West Indies, Ferguson took his first five-wicket haul in T20I cricket. In August 2021, Ferguson was named in New Zealand's squad for the 2021 ICC Men's T20 World Cup. However, he was later ruled out of the tournament following a calf tear.

Honours

 Indian Premier League champion 2022

References

External links
 

1991 births
Living people
New Zealand cricketers
New Zealand Test cricketers
New Zealand One Day International cricketers
New Zealand Twenty20 International cricketers
Cricketers from Auckland
Cricketers at the 2019 Cricket World Cup
Auckland cricketers
Derbyshire cricketers
Rising Pune Supergiant cricketers
Kolkata Knight Riders cricketers
Yorkshire cricketers
Manchester Originals cricketers
Gujarat Titans cricketers